Chris Dean may refer to:
 Chris Dean (rugby league) (born 1988), English rugby league footballer
 Chris Dean (rugby union) (born 1994), Scottish rugby union player

See also
 Christopher Dean, British ice dancer